Dotara is an action-drama Bengali film directed by Amitabha Dasgupta and produced by Tapasi Dasgupta Communication. The film starring an ensemble of Subrat Dutta, Rajesh Sharma, Snigdha Pandey, Sonalee Chaudhuri, Dipankar Dey, Biswajit Chakraborty, Suman Banerjee, Pradip Bhattacharya and Swantana Basu, explores the idea of identity crisis among a small community of people settled in the north-eastern part of West Bengal. The film was theatrically released on 11 January 2019.

Cast 

 Biswajit Chakraborty
 Dipankar Dey
 Snigdha Pandey
 Sonali Chowdhury
 Subrat Dutta
 Rajesh Sharma
 Suman Banerjee
 Pradip Bhattacharya
 Swantana Basu

Release
The official trailer of the film was launched on 22 July 2018.

The film was theatrically released on 11 January 2019.

Soundtrack

The soundtrack was composed by Shanku Mitra and Kalyan Sen Barat on lyrics of Gautam Ghoshal, Shyamal Sengupta, Tarun Sinha and Amitabha Dasgupta.

References

External links
 

2019 films
Bengali-language Indian films
2010s Bengali-language films